The Geography of Freedom: The Odyssey of Élisée Reclus, originally published as The Anarchist Way to Socialism in 1979, is a biography of Élisée Reclus by Marie Fleming.

Bibliography

External links 

 Full text of 1979 edition from the Internet Archive
 Full text of 1988 edition from the Internet Archive

1979 non-fiction books
English-language books
Rowman & Littlefield books
Biographies about anarchists